Miandehi (also Romanized as Mīāndehī) is a village in Balaband Rural District, in the Central District of Fariman County, Razavi Khorasan Province, Iran. At the 2006 census, its population was 616, in 137 families.

References 

Populated places in Fariman County